In geometry, the Steiner ellipse of a triangle, also called the Steiner circumellipse to distinguish it from the Steiner inellipse, is the unique circumellipse (ellipse that touches the triangle at its vertices) whose center is the triangle's centroid.  Named after Jakob Steiner, it is an example of a circumconic. By comparison the circumcircle of a triangle is another circumconic that touches the triangle at its vertices, but is not centered at the triangle's centroid unless the triangle is equilateral.

The area of the Steiner ellipse equals the area of the triangle times  and hence is 4 times the area of the Steiner inellipse. The Steiner ellipse has the least area of any ellipse circumscribed about the triangle.

The Steiner ellipse is the scaled Steiner inellipse (factor 2, center is the centroid). Hence both ellipses are similar (have the same eccentricity).

Properties 

 A Steiner ellipse is the only ellipse, whose center is the centroid  of a triangle  and contains the points . The area of the Steiner ellipse is -fold of the triangle's area.

Proof
A) For an equilateral triangle the Steiner ellipse is the circumcircle, which is the only ellipse, that fulfills the preconditions. The desired ellipse has to contain the triangle reflected at the center of the ellipse. This is true for the circumcircle. A conic is uniquely determined by 5 points. Hence the circumcircle is the only Steiner ellipse.

B) Because an arbitrary triangle is the affine image of an equilateral triangle, an ellipse is the affine image of the unit circle and the centroid of a triangle is mapped onto the centroid of the image triangle, the property (a unique circumellipse with the centroid as center) is true for any triangle.
 
The area of the circumcircle of an equilateral triangle is  -fold of the area of the triangle. An affine map preserves the ratio of areas. Hence the statement on the ratio is true for any triangle and its Steiner ellipse.

Determination of conjugate points 

An ellipse can be drawn (by computer or by hand), if besides the center at least two conjugate points on conjugate diameters are known. In this case
 either one determines by Rytz's construction the vertices of the ellipse and draws the ellipse with a suitable ellipse compass
or uses an parametric representation for drawing the ellipse. 

Let be  a triangle and its centroid . The shear mapping with axis  through  and parallel to  transforms the triangle onto the isosceles triangle   (see diagram). Point  is a vertex of the Steiner ellipse of triangle . This vertex can be determined from the data (ellipse with center  through  and) by calculation. It turns out that

Or by drawing: Using de la Hire's method (see center diagram) vertex  of the Steiner ellipse of the isosceles triangle  is determined.

With help of this pair of conjugate semi diameters the ellipse can be drawn, by hand or by computer.

Parametric representation and equation 

Given: Triangle 
Wanted: Parametric representation and equation of its Steiner ellipse

The centroid of the triangle is 

Parametric representation:

From the investigation of the previous section one gets the following parametric representation of the Steiner ellipse:

 The  four vertices of the ellipse are   where  comes from

The roles of the points for determining the parametric representation can be changed.

Example (see diagram): .

Equation:

If the origin is the centroid of the triangle (center of the Steiner ellipse) the equation corresponding to the parametric representation  is
 

Example:
The centroid of triangle  is the origin. From the vectors 
 one gets the equation of the Steiner ellipse:

Determination of the semi-axes and linear eccentricity 
If the vertices are already known (see above), the semi axes can be determined. If one is interested in the axes and eccentricity only, the following method is more appropriate:

Let be  the semi axes of the Steiner ellipse. From Apollonios theorem on properties of conjugate semi diameters of ellipses one gets:
 

 

The linear eccentricity of the Steiner ellipse is
 
and the area

One should not confuse  in this section with other meanings in this article !

Trilinear equation

The equation of the Steiner circumellipse in trilinear coordinates is

for side lengths a, b, c.

Alternative calculation of the semi axes and linear eccentricity 

The semi-major and semi-minor axes (of a triangle with sides of length a, b, c) have lengths

and focal length

where 

The foci are called the Bickart points  of the triangle.

See also
Triangle conic

References

 Georg Glaeser, Hellmuth Stachel, Boris Odehnal: The Universe of Conics, Springer 2016, p.383

Curves defined for a triangle
Conic sections